Little Rural Riding Hood is a 1949 MGM animated cartoon short subject directed by Tex Avery, conceived as a follow-up to his 1943 cartoon Red Hot Riding Hood.

In 1994, the cartoon was ranked in 23rd place of The 50 Greatest Cartoons. It is essentially a retelling of the Aesop fable, "The Town Mouse and the Country Mouse".

Plot
The film opens with a stereotypical hillbilly version of Little Red Riding Hood (voiced by Colleen Collins), telling the audience that she is taking "nourishment" (as she holds up a cliché moonshine bottle) to her grandma, who lives on a country farm. At the farmhouse, a wolf (voiced by Pinto Colvig) reveals himself to the audience, but confesses that he doesn't want to eat Red. He is actually in love with her and wishes to kiss her.

After a comical chase around the farmhouse, the wolf catches Red, and both prepare to kiss each other when a telegram arrives for the wolf from his city cousin (voiced by Daws Butler impersonating Ronald Colman), inviting him to meet the city's equivalent of his Red (the same version seen in Red Hot Riding Hood). Upon seeing her photograph, the country wolf immediately falls in love with her and departs for the city.

Unlike his rural cousin, the city wolf is rich, suave, and sophisticated. The city wolf takes his cousin to a local nightclub where the city's Red performs her seductive song-and-dance routine, a rendition of "Oh Johnny, Oh Johnny, Oh!" called "Oh Wolfie" (elements of this scene were recycled from Avery's 1945 cartoon Swing Shift Cinderella). The country wolf whistles and leers throughout the performance, becoming completely aroused by Red. However, before he can rush onto the stage to join her, his city cousin stops him (by grabbing his suspenders, placing a hammer in it, then letting go so it would snap back and knock him out), and takes him back to the country, feeling that city life is too much for him.

Upon their arrival at the farmhouse, they find the country's Red waiting for them. Upon seeing country-Red, the city wolf, surprisingly, becomes wildly attracted to her, and runs to her, but is stopped his country cousin the same way the city cousin had stopped him earlier. Seeing an opportunity to see the city's Red again, the country wolf promptly decides to take his city cousin back home, claiming that he feels the country life is too much for him, and drives off back to the city.

Crew
Directed by: Tex Avery
Story: Rich Hogan, Jack Cosgriff
Animation: Walter Clinton, Bob Cannon, Grant Simmons, Michael Lah
Backgrounds: John Didrik Johnsen
Music: Scott Bradley
Co-Producer: William Hanna
Produced by: Fred Quimby

References

External links

1949 animated films
1949 short films
1949 films
Metro-Goldwyn-Mayer animated short films
Films directed by Tex Avery
Films based on Little Red Riding Hood
American parody films
Fairy tale parody films
American sex comedy films
Erotic fantasy films
Animated films about wolves
1940s American animated films
1940s animated short films
1949 comedy films
Self-reflexive films
Metro-Goldwyn-Mayer films
Films scored by Scott Bradley
Tex Avery's Big Bad Wolf films
American comedy short films
Films produced by Fred Quimby
Metro-Goldwyn-Mayer cartoon studio short films
Red (animated character) films
Films about hillbillies
Films set on farms
Films set in nightclubs